was a province of Japan until 1871; since then, it has been a part of Niigata Prefecture. It lies on the eponymous Sado Island, off the coast of Niigata Prefecture (or in the past, Echigo Province).
 
Sado was famous for the silver and gold mined on the island. In the Kamakura Period, the province was granted to the Honma clan from Honshū, and they continued to dominate Sado until 1589, when Uesugi Kagekatsu of Echigo Province took over the island. The Tokugawa shōguns later made Sado a personal fief after Sekigahara, and assumed direct control of its mines.

Since 2004 Sado city has comprised the entire island.

History

Historical districts
 Niigata Prefecture
 Hamochi District (羽茂郡) - merged with Kamo and Sawata Districts to become Sado District (佐渡郡) on April 1, 1896
 Kamo District (賀茂郡) - merged with Hamochi and Sawata Districts to become Sado District on April 1, 1896
 Sawata District (雑太郡) - merged with Hamochi and Kamo Districts to become Sado District on April 1, 1896

Notes

References
 Nussbaum, Louis-Frédéric and Käthe Roth. (2005).  Japan encyclopedia. Cambridge: Harvard University Press. ;  OCLC 58053128

External links 

  Murdoch's map of provinces, 1903

Former provinces of Japan
Hokuriku region
States and territories disestablished in 1871
1871 disestablishments in Japan